Satyananda Stokes (born Samuel Evans Stokes, Jr., 16 August 1882 – 14 May 1946) was an American who settled in India and participated in the Indian Independence Movement. He is best remembered today for having introduced apple cultivation to the Indian state of Himachal Pradesh, where apples are today the major horticultural export crop.

Biography
Satyananda was born Samuel Evans Stokes, Jr., in an American Quaker family. His father, a very successful businessman, was the founder of the Stokes and Parish Machine Company which was a leading manufacturer of elevators in the USA. The Young Samuel did not acquire any professional skill as he was not interested in business. Nevertheless, his father made many efforts to involve him in running the business but Samuel was not interested as he believed in doing greater good in life. Since the family was wealthy, they provided for his needs.

In 1904, aged 22, Samuel came to India to work at a leper colony located at Subathu in the Shimla. His parents were opposed to this move, but he did it anyway because it was a job where he felt happy and satisfied. India was also far away from his parents and other people who looked down on him for not taking over his family business with eagerness. The lepers needed him and adored him and the other local people treated him with great respect because he was a foreign man doing a pious job. Once his parents realized that this job fulfilled some deep emotional need of their son, they supplied him with considerable money, which he used both for the leper colony and for helping local villagers in small ways, all of which further enhanced his respectability. Raised a Quaker, Samuel was drawn to the asceticism that is exalted in Indian spirituality and began living a simple, frugal life among the villagers, becoming a sort of Christian Sannyasi.

A few years later, the Archbishop of Canterbury, who was visiting the Viceroy at Simla (the summer capital of the British Raj) heard of the leper colony and was impressed. He encouraged Samuel to form an order of Franciscan Friars, an order of monkhood committed to living in poverty and aiding the diseased and dying. Samuel formed such an order, but his membership in this wandering brotherhood of monks lasted only two years.

In 1912, Samuel married a local girl, gave up his life of poverty, purchased a chunk of farmland near his wife's village in Kotgarh  and settled there. His wife, Agnes, was the daughter of a first generation Christian.  Samuel's father had settled a considerable fortune upon Samuel, and the purchasing power of this inheritance was magnified manifold in the remote, beautiful part of India where he settled. He had also by now dealt with the demons of failure that had plagued his growing years, and as a white man in an uncritical rural society, in the company of an Indian wife who was non-judgmental and made few demands on his, Samuel was happier than he had ever been before. The family grew with the birth of seven children.

Stokes was a critic of the Christ myth theory. He authored the book The Historical Character of the Gospel published by the Christian Literature Society for India, Madras. It was republished in London as The Gospel According to Jews and Pagans (1913). He argued for the historicity of Jesus and his crucifixion.

Samuel applied himself to improving the farmland he had purchased and was able to access scholarly resources unknown to the other villagers in this endeavour. He identified a new strain of apples developed by the Stark brothers of Louisiana, United States as being suitable to the Simla Hills and began cultivating them on his farm in Kotgarh. This was in the year 1916. The resulting bumper crops, coupled with Samuel's access to the white people who ran the export business in Delhi encouraged the other farmers to do as Samuel was doing, and he helped them wholeheartedly in every way. Indeed, he purchased more land and devoted it to growing apple cultivars which the villagers would use to seed their own farms. The local economy was vastly reinvigorating.

This happy idyll was shattered with the loss of his son Tara to amoebic dysentery. He moved closer to Hinduism and a few years later in 1932 he converted to Hinduism, taking the name "Satyananda" while his wife Agnes changed her name to "Priyadevi". Stokes' decision to convert to Hinduism was painful for his wife Agnes because it would cut her off from those she loved but she was prepared to follow the rest of the family through the painful readjustment.

Stokes had always had a strong sense of social justice and later became active in India's freedom struggle for independence from Great Britain. Stokes had the rare honour of being the only American to become a member of the All India Congress Committee (AICC) of the Indian National Congress. Along with Lala Lajpat Rai, he represented Punjab. He was the only non-Indian to sign the Congress manifesto in 1921, calling upon Indians to quit government service. He was jailed for sedition and promoting hatred against the British government in 1921, becoming the only American to become a political prisoner of Great Britain in the freedom struggle. On Stokes’ arrest, Mahatma Gandhi wrote: "That he (Stokes) should feel with and like an Indian, share his sorrows and throw himself into the struggle, has proved too much for the government. To leave him free to criticise the government was intolerable, so his white skin has proved no protection for him…"

He died on 14 May 1946 after an extended illness shortly before Indian independence.

Works
 Arjun: The Life-Story of an Indian Boy. (as Samuel Evans Stokes). Westminster, 1910.
 The Gospel According to Jews and Pagans: The Historical Character of the Gospel Established from Non-Christian Sources. (as Samuel Evans Stokes). Longmans, Green, 1913.
 The Failure of European Civilisation as a World Culture. (as Samuel Evans Stokes). Pub. S. Ganesan & Co., 1921
 National Self-realisation and Other Essays. (as Samuel Evans Stokes) Rubicon Pub. House. 1977
 Satyakama: Man Of True Desire. Indian Publishers Distributors, 1998. .

References

Further reading

A Quaker who joined freedom struggle at Tribune India
Samuel Evans Stokes, Mahatma Gandhi, and Indian Nationalism The Pacific Historical Review, Vol. 59, No. 1. (Feb., 1990), pp. 51–76.

External links

 Samuel Evans Stokes of India
 Famous Personalities from Shimla

1882 births
1946 deaths
American emigrants to India
Immigrants to British India
American expatriates in India
American Protestant missionaries
American Quakers
Converts to Hinduism from Christianity
Critics of the Christ myth theory
Indian independence activists from Himachal Pradesh
Indian National Congress politicians
Former Quakers
People from Shimla
Politicians from Philadelphia
Protestant missionaries in India
Quaker missionaries
Writers from Himachal Pradesh
Indian Hindus
Indian Hindu missionaries